Daniel Brooks (born 5 January 1987) is an English professional golfer who currently plays on the Challenge Tour, having previously played on the European Tour and PGA EuroPro Tour.

Professional career
Brooks turned professional in 2007 and spent his first three years as a professional playing on the PGA EuroPro Tour. In 2009, Brooks recorded his first and only win on the PGA EuroPro Tour at the Sureshot GPS International Open at Bovey Castle.

In 2010, Brooks joined the Challenge Tour after failing to gain his European Tour playing rights at qualifying school for the second consecutive year in 2009. Brooks continued to play on the Challenge Tour for the 2011 and 2012 seasons. He earned his first European Tour card by finishing 21st on the 2012 Challenge Tour rankings. In 2013 he split his time between the two tours before re-earning his playing rights on the European Tour for the 2014 season at qualifying school in 2013. This success at qualifying school was his first in six attempts.

Brook's made a good start to his 2014 European Tour season, making the cut in each of his first eight competition before achieving his maiden European Tour victory at the 2014 Madeira Islands Open - Portugal - BPI in just his ninth start on tour. The win was overshadowed by the death of Alastair Forsyth's caddie, Iain McGregor, of a heart attack during play, with many people criticising the decision to play on and complete the tournament following the death.

Although Brooks finished 140th in the Race to Dubai (thirty places outside the final guaranteed exempt position), his win exempted him for the 2015 season.

Professional wins (6)

European Tour wins (1)

*Note: The 2014 Madeira Islands Open - Portugal - BPI was shortened to 36 holes due to weather.
1Dual-ranking event with the Challenge Tour

European Tour playoff record (1–0)

Challenge Tour wins (1)

*Note: The 2014 Madeira Islands Open - Portugal - BPI was shortened to 36 holes due to weather.
1Dual-ranking event with the European Tour

Challenge Tour playoff record (1–0)

PGA EuroPro Tour wins (1)

Jamega Pro Golf Tour wins (2)

Clutch Pro Tour wins (1)

Other wins (1)

Results in major championships

CUT = missed the halfway cut

See also
2012 Challenge Tour graduates
2013 European Tour Qualifying School graduates

References

External links

English male golfers
European Tour golfers
Sportspeople from Basildon
Golfers from London
1987 births
Living people